Antman or Ant Man or variation, may refer to:

Marvel Comics topics
 Ant-Man, a Marvel Comics superhero
 Ant-Man (Marvel Cinematic Universe character), the film version of the Marvel Comics character
 Ant-Man (film), 2015 film based on the fictional superhero in the MCU
 Ant-Man (soundtrack), 2015 film soundtrack album
 Ant-Man (TV series), 2017 animated U.S. DisneyXD TV show based on the Marvel character

People

Nicknamed
 Mark Cruz (born 1992), Filipino basketball player nicknamed "Ant Man"
 E. O. Wilson (1929–2021), U.S. biologist nicknamed "Ant Man" for his studies with ants, being the foremost experts on ants.
 Anthony Edwards (basketball) (born 2001), American basketball player nicknamed "Ant Man".

Surnamed "Antman"
Aki Antman, computer programmer and author of SuperBBS
Giora Antman (born 1962), Israeli soccer player and coach
Karen H. Antman, American physician and academic
Niv Antman (born 1992), Israeli footballer
Oliver Antman (born 2001), Finnish footballer
Sören Antman (born 1967), Swedish boxer
Stuart S. Antman (born 1939), American mathematician

Surnamed "Antmen"
Ahu Antmen (born 1971), Turkish professor

Other fictional characters
 "Ant Man", a fictional man/ant hybrid in the Indian superhero franchise Krrish (franchise)

Other uses
 "Antman" (song), a song by The Red Chord from Clients
 Casio G-Shock Antman, Master of G series watch

See also

 Ant-Man and the Wasp, 2018 sequel film to the 2015 MCU film

 
Antoan
 Antuan
 Manant (disambiguation) including man-ant
 Ant (disambiguation)
 Man (disambiguation)